ʿAbū Ṭālib ʿAbd al-Salām ibn al-Ḥasan al-Maʾmūnī (after 953 CE in Baghdad – 993) was an Arabic poet, noted for his epigrammatic writing.

Life

Al-Maʾmūnī's name indicates that he was descended from the caliph al-Maʾmūn. Though born in Baghdād, he soon moved to Rayy, where he studied with Ṣāḥib Ibn ʿAbbād; falling out with some of Ibn ʿAbbād's circle, he moved to Nīshāpūr, joining the court of Abu ’l-Ḥusayn al-ʿUtbī and his successor Abū Naṣr in Bukhārā through the patronage of Ibn Sīmjūr, a Sāmānid commander. There he met al-Tha'ālibī, who was later to write a biography and record the lion's share of al-Maʾmūnī's surviving verse. Although al-Tha'ālibī reports that al-Maʾmūnī aspired to win (or regain?) the ʿAbbāsid caliphate, this clearly never transpired, and he died of hydropsy in 383/993.

Works

While he wrote in other forms, al-Maʾmūnī's oeuvre is most noted for its short, ekphrastic epigrams, showing Persian influence and characteristic of the Perso-Arabic literary concept of waṣf ('description') on themes such as buildings, utensils (for example, writing implements, scissors, baskets), fruits, and foods. The following, 'fī al-tannūr' ('on a baking oven') is an example (albeit attested only in one manuscript):

(Here the conceit is that an unbaked piece of bread looks like the moon, and when baked it is like the sun.)

Another example is this five-line verse in three-foot rajaz lines:

Epigram topics

Epigrams included by Bürgel but not in the Beirut edition:
 12. mā amara b-kitābatihi ʿalā khiwān / Was er auf ein Tablett zu schreiben befahl
 33. fī al-turs / Auf den Schild
 34. al-manāra / Auf das Minarett
 36. mā amara bi-kitābatihi ʿalā fināʾi dār / Was er auf dem Vorhof eines Palastes als Inschrift anbringen ließ
 37. mā amara bi-kitābatihi ʿalā fināʾi dār / Was er auf dem Vorhof eines Palastes als Inschrift anbringen ließ
 49. al-ruṭab al-muʿassal fī barniyyat zujāj / Auf Datteln in Honig in einer Glasschale
 50. al-ruṭab al-muʿassal fī barniyyat zujāj / Auf Datteln in Honig in einer Glasschale
 93 al-muzawwara / Auf die Diät

Style 
Al-Maʾmūnī's style is a good example of the general tendencies of Arabic poetry of the 4th/10th centuries, which, like the New Persian poetry that was emerging at the same time, tended towards florid and sophisticated forms resembling later European mannerism; no verse was complete without incorporating some conceit (Persian nukte). Thus al-Maʾmūnī uses ostentatiously artful language and unusual words, sometimes creating a purposefully comical contrast between the banality of the content and the pathos of the expression. In Bürgel's estimation, al-Maʾmūnī's language is sometimes rather strained, as in epigram 45 (in Bürgel's numbering, on barley-water), but at other times manages to sound both natural and fresh, as in epigram 7 (on a palm-fibre basket). Though not much inclined to use hyperbole or the device of repeating the same word in different meaning, al-Maʾmūnī is fond of word-play and sound-play, making extensive use of assonance and alliteration. He often deploys antithesis, ranging from simple opposites such as standing and sitting (e.g. poems 1, 2, 3, 94), black and white (e.g. 73), or gold and silver (76, 78, 83, 84) to complex forms (and, in 11 and 18, joking pseudo-antitheses).

Metaphor is central to al-Maʾmūnī's epigrams, which often have a riddlic quality: while in some poems, the subject is named explicitly at the outset, others start with the metaphor, challenging the audience to guess the subject matter before being explicit. While all his descriptions are short and pointed and characterised by fantastical metaphors, each poem almost always contains one or more lines that make a literal statement about the subject, for example that the throne has iron posts and a leather cover (epigram 1), that the bucket is made in Damascus and that its handle creaks (6), or that there are brown and white feathers in the pen box (14).

Personification of inanimate objects is a key technique, sometimes achieved using the terms dhū/dhāt ('owner'), and ibn/ibna ('son/daughter'). Al-Maʾmūnī values harmonious choices of metaphors in his epigrams, for example using only tree-based metaphors in poem 4, and uses a rich array of linguistic techniques to express his comparisons: the usual particles ka kaʾanna, kaʾannamā, mithl and li; verbs from the roots sh-b-h (form IV) and ḥ-k-y (forms I and III); first-person verbs reflecting his personal perspective such as khaltu, ḥasibtu, raʾaitu, taʾammaltu; and direct "A = B" juxtaposition of his comparisons without particles. Al-Maʾmūnī's favoured form of metonymy is synecdoche, especially via adjectives, which also contributes to the riddlic character of the verse. He makes extensive use of the technique that the Persian critic of Arabic literature al-Jurjānī called tafṣīl ('going into details'), whereby a natural unity is dissolved into a fantastic multiplicity: for example, epigram 64, on the melon, says that "" ('she has a garment made of pomegranate flowers and lilies, covered with myrtles after rain'). Much more rarely, he uses the opposite device of presenting a multiplicity as a whole (as in epigram 73, on white cheese and olives). Like riddles, al-Maʾmūnī's epigrams frequently deploy comparison through subtraction: thus the candle-holder (epigram 4) is "" ('like a garden in which a large tree trembles which neither earth nor rain enabled to grow').

Primary sources

The main source for al-Maʾmūnī and his work is the Kitāb Yatīmat al-dahr fī mahāsin ahl al-ʿasṛ by Abū Manṣūr al-Thaʿālibī (who had met al-Maʾmūnī and had access to at least some of his verse in manuscript):

 ʿAbd al-Malik ibn Muḥammad Thaʿālibī, Yatīmat al-dahr fī shuʿarāʼ ahl al-ʿaṣr, 4 vols (Damascus: [al-Maṭbaʿah al-Ḥifnīyah] , 1302 AH [1885 CE]), vol. 1, vol. 2, vol. 3, vol. 4: iv, 84-112 [part 4, chapter 3].
 Muḥammad Muḥyī al-Dīn ‘Abd al-Ḥamīd  (ed.), 4 vols (Cairo 1956), vol. 1, vol. 3, vol. 4, iv, 149–79.
 ʻAbd al-Malik ibn Muḥammad Thaʻālibī, Yatīmat al-dahr fī maḥāsin ahl al-ʻaṣr maʻ al-tatimma wa-l-fahāris, ed. by Mufīd Muḥammad Qumayḥah, 6 vols (Bayrūt: Dār al-Kutub al-ʻIlmīyah, 1983), vols 1-4 (index vol. 6). Machine-readable text.

Some verses appear elsewhere, including the Nihāyat al-arab by al-Nuwayri and the Asrār al-balāgha by al-Jurjānī.

Other editions and translations
 Johann Christoph Bürgel, Die ekphrastischen Epigramme des Abū Ṭālib al-Maʾmūnī: Literaturkundliche Studie über einen arabischen Conceptisten, Nachrichten der Akademie der Wissenschaften in Göttingen, Philologisch-Historische Klasse, 1965/14 (Göttingen: Vandenhoeck & Ruprecht, 1965).
 al-Ma'mūnī's poetry at Poetsgate
 Machine-readable text of al-Tha'ālibī's account

References

10th-century births
993 deaths
Year of birth uncertain
10th-century Arabic poets
Poets from Nishapur